Gem Glacier is the smallest named glacier in Glacier National Park (U.S.). Located on the east (Glacier County) side of the Continental Divide arête known as the Garden Wall, the glacier is situated on the cliff face above the better known Grinnell Glacier. Gem Glacier is a hanging glacier, and drapes down from the north face of the steep arete to which it is attached. Gem Glacier is only  in area and is far below the  threshold often cited as qualifying as an active glacier. Between 1966 and 2005, Gem Glacier lost 30 percent of its acreage and Grinnell Glacier lost 40 percent.

See also
 List of glaciers in the United States
 Glaciers in Glacier National Park (U.S.)

References

Glaciers of Glacier County, Montana
Glaciers of Glacier National Park (U.S.)
Glaciers of Montana